Bumin Qaghan (also known as Illig Qaghan (Chinese: 伊利可汗, Pinyin: Yīlì Kèhán, Wade–Giles: i-li k'o-han) or Yamï Qaghan (died 552 AD)) was the founder of the Turkic Khaganate. He was the eldest son of Ashina Tuwu (吐務 / 吐务). He was the chieftain of the Turks under the sovereignty of Rouran Khaganate. He is also mentioned as "Tumen" (commander of ten thousand) of the Rouran Khaganate.

Early life and reign 
According to History of Northern Dynasties and Zizhi Tongjian, in 545 Tumen's tribe started to rise and frequently invaded the western frontier of Wei. The chancellor of Western Wei, Yuwen Tai, sent An Nuopanto (安諾盤陀, Nanai-Banda, a Sogdian from Bukhara,) as an emissary to the Göktürk chieftain Tumen, in an attempt to establish a commercial relationship. In 546, Tumen paid tribute to the Western Wei state. In that same year, Tumen put down a revolt of the Tiele tribes against the Rouran Khaganate, their overlords. Following this, Tumen felt entitled to request of the Rouran a princess as his wife. The Rouran khagan, Anagui, sent a message refusing this request and adding: "You are my blacksmith slave. How dare you utter these words?" Bumin got angry, killed Anagui's emissary, and severed relations with the Rouran Khaganate. Anagui's "blacksmith" (鍛奴 / 锻奴, Pinyin: duàn nú, Wade–Giles: tuan-nu) insult was recorded in Chinese chronicles. Some sources state that members of the Tujue did serve blacksmiths for the Rouran elite, and that "blacksmith slavery" may refer to a kind of vassalage that prevailed in Rouran society. Nevertheless, after this incident Bumin emerged as the leader of the revolt against Rouran.

In 551, Bumin requested a Western Wei princess in marriage. Yuwen Tai permitted it and sent Princess Changle(長樂公主) of Western Wei to Bumin. In the same year when Emperor Wen of Western Wei died, Bumin sent mission and gave two hundred horses.

The beginning of formal diplomatic relations with China propped up Bumin's authority among the Turks. He eventually united the local Turkic tribes and threw off the yoke of the Rouran domination. In 552 Bumin's army defeated Anagui's forces at the north of Huaihuang and then Anagui committed suicide. With their defeat Bumin proclaimed himself "Illig Qaghan" and made his wife qaghatun. "Illig" means Ilkhan (i.e. ruler of people) in Old Turkic. According to the Bilge Qaghan's memorial complex and the Kul Tigin's memorial complex, Bumin and Istemi ruled people by Turkic laws and they developed them.

Death and family 
Bumin died within several months after proclaiming himself Illig Qaghan. He was married to Princess Changle of Western Wei. 

Issue:

 Ashina Keluo (阿史那科罗) - Issig Qaghan
 Ashina Qijin (阿史那俟斤) - Muqan Qaghan
 Taspar Qaghan
 Ashina Kutou (阿史那庫頭) - Ditou Qaghan (appointed by Muqan Qaghan to be lesser khagan of eastern wing of Turkic Empire)
 Mahan Tigin - Lesser khagan appointed by Taspar Qaghan
 Rudan Qaghan (褥但可汗)
 Böri Qaghan (步離可汗) - Lesser khagan of appointed by Taspar Qaghan

Legacy 
He was succeeded by his younger brother Istemi in the western part and by his son Issik Qaghan in the eastern part. In less than one century, his khaganate expanded to comprise most of Central Asia.

Notes

References 

 
 

552 deaths
Göktürk khagans
6th-century Turkic people
Year of birth unknown
Ashina house of the Turkic Empire
Founding monarchs
Leaders who took power by coup
Rouran